Two ships of the Royal Navy have been named HMS Flamingo, after the bird.

 The first  was a composite screw gunvessel launched in 1876, sent to harbour service in 1893, and sold 1923.
 The second  was a  sloop. She was laid down by Yarrow Shipbuilders at Scotstoun in Glasgow on 26 May 1938, launched on 18 April 1939, completed on 3 November 1939 and commissioned 3 December 1939. Flamingo was sold to West Germany in January 1959, and renamed Graf Spee.

Royal Navy ship names